The Bolshoy Ik (literally Greater Ik; , Olo Iyıq) is a tributary of the Sakmara, which flows south from the southern end of the Ural Mountains in Bashkortostan and Orenburg Oblast, Russia.

The river is generally fed by snowmelt.

See also
List of rivers of Russia
Nakas (mountain)

References 

Rivers of Bashkortostan
Rivers of Orenburg Oblast
Ural basin